Matthew Martin Rosendale Sr. (born July 7, 1960) is an American politician and businessman from Montana. A member of the Republican Party, he is the U.S. representative for Montana's 2nd congressional district. He was first elected to the at-large district in 2020.

Before his election to Congress, Rosendale was the Montana state auditor. He was also a member of the Montana Legislature from 2011 to 2017, in both houses.

Early life and career
Rosendale was born and raised in Maryland. He spent his career working in real estate, real estate development and land management. He grew his family real estate business from a single, five-agent office into a full-service firm with 65 agents and four offices.

In 2002, Rosendale and his family moved to Glendive, Montana. He was twice elected chairman of the Glendive Agri-Trade Expo committee, a local group that puts on an agriculture exposition showcasing agri-business in eastern Montana. Rosendale also served as head of his local Catholic parish council.

Montana State Legislature
Rosendale says his friends and neighbors in Glendive urged him to run for the state legislature to reduce spending and regulations, defend their gun and property rights, and protect the sanctity of life.

He served one two-year term in the Montana House of Representatives and one four-year term in the Montana Senate, during which he served as majority leader.

2010 Montana House of Representatives election 
Rosendale announced he would run for the Montana House of Representatives to represent House District 38, which covers Wibaux and part of Dawson County. Also seeking the Republican nomination were Edward Hilbert and Alan Doane. Rosendale prevailed, receiving 48.4% of the vote to Doane's 41.3% and Hilbert's 10.4%.

Rosendale defeated Democratic incumbent State Representative Dennis Getz in the general election, with 52.7% of the vote to Getz's 47.3%.

2011 state legislative session 
During the 2011 legislative session, Rosendale served on several committees, including the Business and Labor Committee, the Transportation Committee, and the Local Government Committee.

2012 Montana Senate election 
In 2012, with State Senator Donald Steinbeisser ineligible for reelection due to term limits, Rosendale announced he would run for the Montana Senate to represent Senate District 19, a heavily Republican district in eastern Montana.

After running unopposed in the Republican primary, Rosendale defeated Democratic nominee Fred Lake in the general election, with 67.6% of the vote to Lake's 32.4%.

2013 Senate session 
During the 2013 legislative session, Rosendale served as vice chair of the Natural Resources and Transportation Committee. He also served on the Finance and Claims Committee, the Highways and Transportation Committee and the Natural Resources Committee. During this legislative session, Rosendale was the primary sponsor of a resolution urging Congress to submit a balanced budget amendment to states. He also was the primary sponsor of a bill that became law to prevent law enforcement from using drones for surveillance purposes.

Based on Rosendale's voting record in the 2013 legislative session, he earned a 100% on the Montana Family Foundation's scorecard and was also named a "Champion of Business" by the Montana Chamber of Commerce.

2015 Senate session and Majority Leader tenure 
Due to state redistricting in 2014, Rosendale represented Senate District 18 for the rest of his tenure, starting in 2015. At the beginning of the 2015 legislative session, Rosendale's colleagues in the State Senate elected him to serve as majority leader. He also chaired the Rules Committee and was a member of the Finance and Claims Committee and Natural Resources and Transportation Committee. Rosendale was the primary sponsor of a bill to authorize direct primary care provider plans that passed the legislature before being vetoed by Governor Steve Bullock.

Rosendale's voting record in the 2015 session earned him 100% scores from several organizations, including the Montana Family Foundation. He received the American Conservative Union's Award for Conservative Excellence and was again named a "Champion of Business" by the Montana Chamber of Commerce.

Montana state auditor

Elections

2016 
With State Auditor Monica Lindeen ineligible for reelection due to term limits, Rosendale ran for the position.

Rosendale ran unopposed in the Republican primary. In the general election, he faced Jesse Laslovich, who was Lindeen's chief legal counsel and widely considered one of Montana's rising political stars.

Despite being outspent 4:1, Rosendale defeated Laslovich with 53.6% of the vote to Laslovich's 46.4%. At the time, this was the most expensive State Auditor's race in Montana state history.

2018 U.S. Senate election 

In 2017, Rosendale announced he would seek the Republican nomination to challenge two-term incumbent Democratic Senator Jon Tester.

In a competitive four-way primary, Rosendale faced District Judge Russell Fagg, State Senator Al Olszewski, and combat veteran Troy Downing. Rosendale won the Republican primary with 33.8% of the vote to Fagg's 28.3%, Downing's 19.1% and Olszewski's 18.7%.

After the primary, Rosendale was endorsed by President Donald Trump and Vice President Mike Pence. Trump visited the state to campaign for Rosendale four times, with Pence visiting three times.

Polls showed the race in a statistical tie going into election day, in what was the most expensive election in Montana history, with more than $70 million spent between the two sides. Tester's campaign had a huge cash advantage, raising and spending $21 million to Rosendale's $6 million.

In the general election, Tester won 50.3% of the vote to Rosendale's 46.8%, with Libertarian candidate Rick Breckenridge taking 2.9%.

Tenure
As State Auditor, Rosendale approved direct primary care agreements and  authorized Medi-Share to operate in Montana. Medi-Share, a health care sharing ministry which asks members of a religious faith to pool money together to cover their health care costs, had previously been banned from operating in Montana after the company refused to cover a member’s medical bills. In authorizing Medi-Share to operate in Montana, Rosendale determined that the company did not qualify as an insurer and had no obligation to pay subscribers’ bills. 

He refused to accept a pay raise every year taking an annual salary of $92,236.

As State Auditor, Rosendale was also one of five members of the Montana State Land Board, which oversees the 5.2 million acres in the state trust land.

In 2017, Rosendale proposed legislation that would create a reinsurance program so that individuals with preexisting conditions could access affordable health coverage. This legislation passed both houses of the legislature before being vetoed by Governor Steve Bullock. Rosendale condemned Bullock's veto, saying, "the governor has sacrificed good, bipartisan policy in favor of bad, partisan politics."

Rosendale then worked with a bipartisan group of Montana officials to create a reinsurance program and were granted a waiver to do so by the federal government. The program is now operational.

In 2019, Rosendale proposed legislation targeting pharmacy benefits managers and a practice known as spread pricing. The legislation passed both houses of the legislature before being vetoed by Bullock. Rosendale again condemned Bullock, saying his veto "is a gift to the pharmaceutical and insurance industries and it's a slap in the face to consumers."

U.S. House of Representatives

Elections

2014 

In 2013, incumbent Representative Steve Daines announced that he would not seek reelection and would instead run for the United States Senate. Rosendale then announced his candidacy to succeed Daines in the U.S. House of Representatives. In addition to Rosendale, the Republican field included former State Senators Ryan Zinke and Corey Stapleton, State Representative Elsie Arntzen, and real estate investor Drew Turiano.

Rosendale came in third place with 28.8% of the vote, behind Zinke's 33.3% and Stapleton's 29.3%. Arntzen and Turiano received 6.9% and 1.7%, respectively.

2020 

In June 2019, Representative Greg Gianforte announced that he would not seek reelection and would instead run for governor to replace term-limited Governor Steve Bullock. Days later, Rosendale announced he would run for the open seat.

Rosendale received the early endorsement of President Trump. He also received early endorsements from elected officials around the country, including Senator Ted Cruz, Senator Rand Paul, House Republican Leader Kevin McCarthy, House Republican Whip Steve Scalise and Representative Jim Jordan, as well as the endorsement of the Crow Tribe of Montana. He won the six-way Republican primary with 48.3% of the vote, carrying every county.

Rosendale defeated Democratic nominee Kathleen Williams in the general election in November, with 56.4% of the vote to her 43.6%.

2022 

As a result of the 2020 census and redistricting cycle, Montana regained a congressional district after having had a single at-large district since 1993. Rosendale ran for reelection in the reconstituted second district, which covers the eastern two-thirds of the state and includes Billings, Great Falls, Helena and his home in Glendive.

Rosendale again received Trump's endorsement and won the Republican primary with 75.7% of the vote. He won the general election with 56.6% of the vote, to Independent Gary Buchanan's 22.0% and Democrat Penny Ronning's 20.1%.

Tenure 
Along with all other Senate and House Republicans, Rosendale voted against the American Rescue Plan Act of 2021.

In June 2021, Rosendale was among 21 House Republicans to vote against a resolution to give the Congressional Gold Medal to police officers who defended the U.S. Capitol on January 6. Also in June 2021, he was among 14 House Republicans to vote against passing legislation to establish June 19, or Juneteenth, as a federal holiday.

Foreign and defense policy
In June 2021, Rosendale was one of 49 House Republicans to vote to repeal the AUMF against Iraq.

Rosendale was one of 15 representatives to vote against H.R. 567: Trans-Sahara Counterterrorism Partnership Program Act of 2021, which would establish an interagency program to assist countries in North and West Africa to improve immediate and long-term capabilities to counter terrorist threats, and for other purposes.

In September 2021, Rosendale was among 75 House Republicans to vote against the National Defense Authorization Act of 2022, which contains a provision that would require women to be drafted. He was among 19 House Republicans to vote against the final passage of the 2022 National Defense Authorization Act.

In November 2021, Rosendale was one of six House Republicans to vote against the RENACER Act, which extended U.S. sanctions against Nicaragua and granted the president several ways to address acts of corruption and human rights violations by the Daniel Ortega administration, including the power to exclude Nicaragua from the Dominican Republic-Central America Free Trade Agreement (CAFTA-DR) and to obstruct multilateral loans to the country.

Rosendale issued a statement in opposition to intervention in Ukraine during the 2021–22 Russo-Ukrainian crisis. Later, he sponsored the Secure America’s Border First Act, which would prohibit the expenditure or obligation of military and security assistance to Kyiv over the U.S. border with Mexico.

On March 2, 2022, Rosendale was one of only three House members to vote against a resolution supporting the sovereignty of Ukraine in the face of the Russian invasion.

In 2022, Rosendale voted against a bill that would provide approximately $14 billion to the government of Ukraine.

In July 2022, Rosendale was one of 18 Republicans to vote against ratifying Sweden's and Finland's applications for NATO membership.

In 2023, Rosendale was among 47 Republicans to vote in favor of H.Con.Res. 21 which directed President Joe Biden to remove U.S. troops from Syria within 180 days.

Immigration
In July 2021, Rosendale voted against the bipartisan ALLIES Act, which would increase by 8,000 the number of special immigrant visas for Afghan allies of the U.S. military during its invasion of Afghanistan, while also reducing some application requirements that caused long application backlogs; the bill passed in the House 407–16.

Rosendale sponsored Representative Brian Babin's bill, H.R.140 - Birthright Citizenship Act of 2021, which would eliminate birthright citizenship.

Committee assignments 
 Committee on Veterans Affairs
 Subcommittee on Health
 Subcommittee on Technology Modernization (Ranking Member)
 Committee on Natural Resources
 Subcommittee on National Parks, Forests and Public Lands
 Subcommittee on Indigenous Peoples of the United States

Caucus memberships 
 Freedom Caucus
 Republican Study Committee

Personal life
Rosendale and his wife Jean reside on a ranch north of Glendive. They have three adult children. Their son Adam served briefly in the Montana Legislature in 2017. Rosendale is a Roman Catholic.

Controversy 
On March 1 2023, Rosendale took a photo in front of the United States Capitol with Ryan Sanchez, a former member of the white supremacist gang Rise Above Movement and Greyson Arnold, a Nazi sympathizer and podcaster who was at the January 6 Capitol attack. In an email, Rosendale stated "I absolutely condemn and have zero tolerance for hate groups, hate speech, and violence. I did not take a meeting with these individuals...I was asked for a photo while walking between hearings, accommodating as I do for all photo requests, and was not aware of the individuals' identity or affiliation with these hate groups that stand in stark contrast to my personal beliefs."

During his 2018 campaign, Rosendale faced criticism for repeatedly presenting himself as a “rancher” in interviews and campaign materials despite owning no cattle or a cattle brand according to public records.  Critics labelled Rosendale “all hat, no cattle.” Rosendale, who bought a $2 million ranch near Glendive when he moved to Montana in 2002, said he leased his land and helps run cattle on it. Rosendale later removed the “rancher” label from bios on his website and social media accounts.

Electoral history

2010

2012

2014

2016

2018

2020

2022

References

External links 

 Representative Matt Rosendale official U.S. House website
 Matt Rosendale for Congress
 
 

|-

|-

|-

|-

1960 births
21st-century American politicians
Candidates in the 2018 United States Senate elections
American nationalists
American Roman Catholics
Catholics from Montana
Living people
Republican Party members of the Montana House of Representatives
Republican Party Montana state senators
People from Glendive, Montana
Businesspeople from Montana
Businesspeople from Baltimore
Politicians from Baltimore
Republican Party members of the United States House of Representatives from Montana
State insurance commissioners of the United States